Frances Wolff (March 4, 1926 – March 4, 2013), known professionally as Fran Warren, was an American singer.

She was born into a Jewish family in the New York City borough of the Bronx. After some time in a chorus line at the Roxy Theater, she joined Art Mooney's big band and worked with Billy Eckstine, who gave her the name "Fran Warren". She spent almost two years with the Charlie Barnet band before achieving some recognition with Claude Thornhill. In 1947, she reached the music charts for the first time with the song "A Sunday Kind of Love" written by her manager, Barbara Belle.

She began a solo career in 1948 when she signed a contract with RCA Victor. She had a hit record with "I Said My Pajamas (and Put On My Pray'rs)", a duet with Tony Martin which reached No. 3 on the charts. During the same year, she sang on the radio program Sing It Again. In the early 1950s, after a number of her records failed to chart, she signed with MGM Records. Her last chart hit was "It's Anybody's Heart" in 1953. Her albums included Hey There! Here's Fran Warren arranged by Marty Paich and Something's Coming arranged by Ralph Burns and Al Cohn. Warren performed in the musicals Mame, South Pacific, and The Pajama Game and went on tour with the big band of Harry James.

Personal life
She lived in Connecticut until her death on March 4, 2013, her 87th birthday.

Filmography

Discography
 Mood Indigo (MGM, 1956)
 Hey There! Here's Fran Warren (Tops, 1957)
 Come Rain or Come Shine (Venise, 1959)
 Something's Coming (Warwick, 1960)
 Come into My World (Audio Fidelity, 1968)
 Fran Warren in Nashville (Audio Fidelity, 1969)
 The Complete Fran Warren with Claude Thornhill Orchestra (Collector's Choice, 2000)

References

1926 births
2013 deaths
American women jazz singers
American jazz singers
Big band singers
Jewish American musicians
People from the Bronx
RCA Victor artists
Singers from New York City
Traditional pop music singers
Jazz musicians from New York (state)
21st-century American Jews
21st-century American women